Amir Hossein Maghsoudloo known professionally as Amir Tataloo, is an Iranian singer-songwriter and rapper. Tataloo is the first R&B singer in Iran and also he is part of the first generation of the Iranian underground hip hop scene.

His debut album, Zire Hamkaf, was released in 2011.  Since then, he has released 16 albums.

Tataloo was arrested several times when living in Iran by the Islamic Republic authorities.

In 2021, Amir Tataloo released the album Fereshteh by Universal Music Group. He is the first Iranian to collaborate with Universal Music Group.

Early life 
Amir Hossein Maghsoudloo, stage name Amir Tataloo, was born in Majidieh, Tehran. Due to his father's job, Amir spent his elementary school years in Rasht. After a few years, he moved back to Tehran. Because of his family's financial situation, he decided to work and study simultaneously. From 14 to 16 he worked in a carpenter workshop, and from 16 to 18 worked in a grocery store. After finishing high school, he started to pursue music. The beginning of his career began around the same time as other well-known musicians in Persian underground music.

Music career 
Tataloo started his music career in 2003, and began by releasing songs on his personal blog. He started as an underground musician, and remains unauthorized by the Ministry of Culture and Islamic Guidance. He was described by Time magazine as "A rapper with so many fans" and by Radio Free Europe/Radio Liberty as an artist with a "strong fan base" among the youth in Iran. His music style has been described as a "popular flashy blend of pop, rap and R&B".

He released a single, "Manam Yeki az un Yazdahtam" (I'm Also One of Those Eleven Players), for the Iranian National Football Team during the 2014 FIFA World Cup.

During the Iran/5+1 nuclear talks in Vienna in July 2015, he released a song supporting the Iranian nuclear program. The music video was produced on the Iranian navy ship Damavand. The song was the top trending Google search in Persian. This song became an instant controversy in Iran, mostly for the Iranian Reformists, who compared the song to Mohammadreza Shajarian's songs in support of Iranian protests in 2009.

In 2015 he attended the Tehran Peace Museum and was praised by the Iran-Iraq war veterans for his music video, Shohada (The Martyrs). He was introduced as the peace ambassador of the museum.

In 2018, after several arrests by the Iranian authorities and failing to get a music activity license from the Ministry of Culture and Islamic Guidance, Tataloo left Iran and immigrated to Turkey, where he is currently residing.

Tatality 
Tatality was name of the Tataloo's 2013 album which also is the name of his fan base. "Tatalities" mostly consist of Iranian youth who are dedicated to Tataloo. His fans may follow a lifestyle inspired by Tataloo's, including meditation, spiritual routines and vegan diet.

In 2016, after Tataloo was arrested by Iranian police, his fans protested before the Justice Court and demanded that authorities release him from prison. After his arrest, an online protest began against arresting artists due to their lyrics and lifestyle choices. They used various hashtags in order to pressure Iranian authorities to release him.

Social media 
Tataloo is one of the most popular, yet controversial, Iranian celebrities. He has a large fan base, as well as critics.

Amir Tataloo is the first Iranian who reached 1 million followers on Instagram.

In 2021, Tataloo broke the record for most comments on YouTube with 19 million comments.

In 2019, Tataloo asked fans to break the record of the most commented post on Instagram, which was 10 million comments. Fans broke the record with 18 million comments. After this, various political critics discussed the phenomenon and its impact on society. Academics such as Sadegh Zibakalam and Emaddedin Baghi wrote papers on this event.

Another record was broken in 2020 where Tataloo hosted a live broadcast that ended up with 626,000 viewers.

Among other Iranian singers, he has the most views on Spotify and YouTube.

Personal life 
Tataloo is vegan, and is constantly preaching the vegan philosophy and lifestyle, asking his fans not to kill and eat animals. One of his many nicknames is Nature's Son.

Controversies

Nuclear energy song 
During the Iran/5+1 nuclear talks in Vienna, in July 2015, he released a song supporting the Iranian nuclear program. The music video was produced on the Iranian navy ship Damavand.

Titled "Energy Hasteei", the song's central message was to uphold Iran's right to patrol the Persian Gulf and to produce peaceful nuclear energy. Tataloo's nationalistic song caused controversy among his Iranian fans who respected the artist for his frank, unconforming political and social statements and were surprised to see him appearing to assist the government in their messaging around the nuclear issue.

Child grooming 
Tataloo stirred controversy after he promoted the sexual exploitation of children. He advocated for minors below the age of 16 to be able to get married and invited fans, minors at the time, to join his harem .

Discography

Albums 
 Zire Hamkaf (2011)
 Tatality (2013)
 Man (2014)
 Shomareh 6 (2015)
 Mamnoo'e (2015)
 Shomareh 7 (2016)
 Ghahreman (2017)
 Amir (2017)
 Sayeh (2018)
 Jahanam (2018)
 Barzakh (2019)
 78 (2020)
 Sheytan(2021)
 Fereshteh (2021)
 Sahm (2022)
 Boht (2022)
Cosmos (2022)

References

External links 

Living people
Singers from Tehran
21st-century Iranian male singers
Iranian singer-songwriters
Iranian rappers
Iranian lyricists
Iranian composers
1987 births